Sargent is a 1977 Pakistani Urdu action thriller film directed by Aslam Irani. The lead cast includes Asif Khan, Najma, and Mustafa Qureshi.

Plot
The story of Sargent (Sergeant in English) is about a brave and honest police officer Farid, who puts his life on the line against criminals and smugglers. The other main character is a young man Dilawar, who is misguided by society and turns into a criminal. Dilawar is oppressed, but when the oppression increases, he ends the oppressor. The third character is a woman Shabnam whose husband gets killed in an accident and people rob her of her dignity.

Cast
The film cast includes:
 Najma
 Asif Khan
 Mustafa Qureshi
 Saiqa
 Adeeb
 Afzaal Ahmad
 Bahar Begum
 Saqi
  Seema
 Nanha
 Kemal Irani
 Abid Butt
 Akhtar Shad
 Afshan
 Majeed Zarif
 Saleem Hassan
 Abid Kashmiri
 (Guest appearances: Yasmin Khan, Aurangzeb)

Music and soundtracks
The music of Sargent was composed by  Kamal Ahmed and lyrics were written by Taslim Fazli:
 Hay Noukari Jo Pyari To Phir Yaari Tor Day... Singer(s): Noor Jehan
 Kabhi To Tu Parcha Lay Kay Aye.. Ja Ray Sargent... Singer(s): Noor Jahan
 Kyun Sharabi Sharab Peeta Hay Aur Phir BeHisab Peeta Hay... Singer(s): Mehdi Hassan
 Raat, Ho Geya Sanata, Dil Mein Chubnay Laga Kanta... Singer(s): Noor Jahan
 Zara Dekh Idhar Meri Ankhon Ka Rang Neela Bhi Hay Kala Bhi... Singer(s): Noor Jahan

Release and box office
Sargent was released on 4 August 1977. It was a box office hit.

References

1977 films
1970s Urdu-language films
Pakistani action films
Urdu-language Pakistani films